Abu Bakr bin Ibrahim al-Kanemi (Bukr Garubai, or Abubakar Garbai) ibn Ibrahim was the Shehu of Borno from 1902 to 1922.

Reign
Bukar Garbai (or Abubakar Garbai) ibn Ibrahim was the Shehu of Bornu from 1902 to 1922 and previous to that served as Shehu of Dikwa.  In 1907 he founded Yerwa as the capital.  Abubakar Garbai was the son of Shehu Ibrahim Kura of Borno and the brother of Shehu Sanda Kura.

References

Bibliography
Bosworth, Clifford Edmond, The New Islamic Dynasties: A Chronological and Genealogical Manual p. 128
Cohen, Ronald, The Kanuri of Bornu, Case Studies in Cultural Anthropology (New York: Holt, 1967).
Dictionary of African Historical Biography, p. 100.
Encyclopædia Britannica, 15th Edition (1982), Vol. VI, p. 506.
 Isichei, Elizabeth, A History of African Societies to 1870 (Cambridge: Cambridge University Press, 1997), pp. 318–320, .

Tukur, Mahmud Modibbo, The Imposition of British colonial domination on the Sokoto Caliphate, Borno and neighbouring states, 1879-1914: a reinterpretation of colonial sources (Zaria: Ahmadu Bello University, 1979).
Tukur, Mahmud Modibbo, “Shehu Abubakar Garbai Ibn Ibrahim El-Kanemi and the establishment of British rule in Borno, 1902-1914” in The Essential Mahmud, ed. Mahmud Modibbo Abubakar (Zaria: Ahmadu Bello University, 1989).

Dynasty

External links
Kanuri Studies Association

Royalty of Borno
1922 deaths
Year of birth missing